Ghamiteh (also Romanized as Ghamīţeh and Qamīţeh) is a village in Chahardeh Sankhvast Rural District, Jolgeh Sankhvast District, Jajrom County, North Khorasan Province, Iran. At the 2006 census, its population was 140, in 40 families.

References 

Populated places in Jajrom County